The Partita for orchestra with a solo soprano by the Italian composer Luigi Dallapiccola was composed between 1930 and 1932.

Partita is the work with which Dallapiccola first came to international recognition. Written in memory of the Italian pianist , it is scored in four movements for orchestra, with a soprano solo in the final movement. In a manner analogous to the finale of Mahler's Fourth Symphony, the setting is a childlike medieval Latin lullaby.

Movements
Passacaglia. Molto solenne
Burlesca. Presto ma non troppo – Pochissimo meno – Un poco più mosso – Moderato – Tempo del principio – Tumultoso
Recitativo e Fanfara. Violento – Calmo – Un poco mosso, ma sempre calmo – Molto più lento, trascinato – Ancora movendo – Molto mosso – Animato – Violento
Naenia B.M.V. ("Lullaby of the Blessed Virgin Mary"), with soprano solo. Molto tranquillo – Pochissimo più mosso – Molto tranquillo – Soavissimo – Un poco piu animato – Un poco largamente – Animando – Come prima (Animato) – Molto tranquillo – Celestiale

Recordings
RAI Symphony Orchestra of Turin, Sergiu Celibidache (conductor), Bruna Rizzoli (soprano), recorded 1968, Turin, released Stradivarius Records STR 13608, 1989.
BBC Philharmonic, Gianandrea Noseda (conductor), Gillian Keith (soprano), recorded 2009, Manchester, released Chandos Records CHAN 10561, 2010.
Staatsphilharmonie Rheinland-Pfalz, Karl-Heinz Steffens (conductor), Arantza Ezenarro (soprano) recorded 2014, Ludwigshafen, released Capriccio Records C5214, 2014.

References

Compositions by Luigi Dallapiccola
Compositions for symphony orchestra
Music dedicated to students or teachers